The Black Panther's Cub is a 1921 American silent melodrama film produced by William K. Ziegfeld, Florenz Ziegfeld's younger brother. It stars stage actress Florence Reed in her last silent screen portrayal where she plays multiple roles. It is a lost film.

Plot
As summarized in a film publication, when the law closes the Black Panther's (Reed) house, she gives her daughter into the keeping of her old friend Clive (Stephenson). Clive dies and the Cub (Reed), now a young lady, learns who her mother was. Lord Maudsley (Foxe), Clive's son, is in financial difficulty. He makes the Cub believe that dead benefactor has left large debts, and persuades her to reopen her mother's establishment to obtain the money. She does, and the former admirers of the Black Panther marvel at the way she has retained her youth. Eventually the Cub meets her mother (Reed), now an old woman, in a dive to which the Cub has fled with an admirer to get away from the man she loved, but feared to face in her new existence. The place is raided and the mother is shot. Later Maudsley admits that it was he who needed the money, and the lover forgives the Cub and they are happy together.

Cast
Florence Reed as The Black Panther / Mary Maudsley / Faustine
Norman Trevor as Sir Marling Grayham
Henry Stephenson as Clive, Earl of Maudsley
Paul Doucet as Victim of Chance (credited as Paul Ducet)
Don Merrifield as Sir Charles Beresford
Henry Carvill as Lord Whitford
Louis R. Grisel as Butler (credited as Louis Grisel)
Earle Foxe as Lord Maudsley
William Roselle as Hampton Grayham
Paula Shay as Evelyn Grayham
Halbert Brown as Mr. Laird
Charles Jackson as Stable Boy
Ernest Lambart as Money Lender
Frank DeVernon as Philanthropist
Tyrone Power Sr. as Count Boris Orliff (credited as Tyrone Power)

Reception
One review found the film to be good but complained of a scene where Reed's character was attacked and her bodice was entirely ripped off, saying, what was the use of showing this rather than implying it when the film censors would just cut it?

References

External links

 

 original lobby poster(archived)

1921 films
American silent feature films
Films based on poems
Lost American films
Films directed by Emile Chautard
American black-and-white films
Silent American drama films
1921 drama films
Melodrama films
1921 lost films
Lost drama films
1920s American films